Places where PowerVR technology and its various iterations have been used:

Series1 (NEC)

Series2 (NEC)

Series3 (STMicro)

VGX
PowerVR VGX150

Series4 (MBX and MBX Lite)
Freescale i.MX31 — MBX Lite + FPU (VFP11) + ARM1136
 DAVE Embedded Systems Qong (SOM)
 ELSA PAL Mini Book e-A533-L
 Garz & Fricke Adelaide
 TQ Components TQMa31
 iCEphone
 LORE Embedded TS1

Freescale i.MX31C — MBX Lite + FPU (VFP11) + ARM1136
 Cogent CSB733 (SOM)
 DAVE Embedded Systems Qong (SOM)

Freescale MPC5121e — MBX Lite + VGP Lite + PowerPC e300
 CherryPal C114
 DAVE Embedded Systems Aria (SOM)
 LimePC range (UMPC, HandheldPC, PalmPC, LimePC HDTV set)
 PhaedruS SystemS CSB781
 GDA Technologies Bali Reference Board

Intel CE 2110 (Olo River) — MBX Lite + XScale CPU
 ASUS set-top boxes
 Chunghwa Telecom Multimedia on Demand set-top boxes
 Digeo Moxi Multi-Room HD Digital Media Recorder
 Digeo Moxi Mate
 Digital Video Networks set-top boxes
 OKI Next Generation Hybrid STB
 ZTE set-top boxes

Marvell 2700G - discontinued - (was Intel 2700G (Marathon)) — MBX Lite + XScale PXA27x CPU

 Advance Tech M.A.G.I.C.
 Advantech UbiQ-350
 Advantech UbiQ-470
 Compulab CM-F82 (PowerPC Module)
 Dell Axim X50v
 Dell Axim X51v
 Dresser Wayne iX
 Gigabyte GSmart t600
 Gigabyte GSmart MW998
 Palm Foleo
 Pepper Pad
 PFU Systems MediaStaff DS

NXP Nexperia PNX4008 — MBX Lite + FPU + ARM926
 Sony Ericsson M600 and M608c
 Sony Ericsson P1i and P1c
 Sony Ericsson P990 and P990c
 Sony Ericsson W950i and W958c
 Sony Ericsson W960i and W960c

NXP Nexperia PNX4009 — MBX Lite + FPU + ARM926
 Sony Ericsson G700 and G700c
 Sony Ericsson G700 Business Edition
 Sony Ericsson G900
 Sony Ericsson P200

Renesas SH3707 — MBX + VGP + FPU + SH-4
 Sega Aurora

Renesas SH-Mobile3 (SH73180), Renesas SH-Mobile3+ (SH73182), Renesas SH-Mobile3A (SH73230), Renesas SH-Mobile3A+ (SH73450) — MBX Lite + VGP Lite + SH-X(SH4AL-DSP)

 Fujitsu F702iD
 Fujitsu F901iC
 Fujitsu F902i
 Fujitsu F902iS
 Helio Hero
 Mitsubishi D702i
 Mitsubishi D851iWM (MUSIC PORTER X)
 Mitsubishi D901i
 Mitsubishi D901iS
 Mitsubishi D902i
 Mitsubishi D902iS
 Motorola MS550
 Pantech PN-8300
 SK Teletech (SKY) IM-8300

Renesas SH-Mobile G1 — MBX Lite + VGP Lite + SH-X2(SH4AL-DSP)

 Fujitsu F704i
 Fujitsu Raku-Raku PHONE III (F882iES)
 Fujitsu Raku-Raku PHONE Basic (F883i)
 Fujitsu Raku-Raku PHONE IV (F883iES)
 Fujitsu F903i
 Fujitsu F903iX HIGH-SPEED
 Fujitsu F904i
 Mitsubishi D704i
 Mitsubishi D903i
 Mitsubishi D903iTV
 Mitsubishi D904i

Renesas SH-Mobile G2 — MBX Lite + VGP Lite + SH-X2(SH4AL-DSP)
 Fujitsu F905i
 Mitsubishi D905i
 Sharp SH905i
 Sony Ericsson SO905i
 Sony Ericsson SO905iCS
 Fujitsu F906i
 Fujitsu F706i
 Sharp SH906i
 Sharp SH906iTV
 Sharp SH706i
 Sharp SH706ie
 Sharp SH706iw
 Sony Ericsson SO906i
 Sony Ericsson SO706i

Renesas SH-Navi1 (SH7770) — MBX + VGP + FPU + SH-X(SH-4A), Renesas unidentified — MBX + SuperH

 Alpine Car Information Systems
 Clarion MAX960HD
 Clarion NAX963HD
 Clarion NAX970HD
 Clarion NAX973HD and MAX973HD
 Clarion MAX9700DT
 Clarion MAX9750DT
 Mitsubishi HDD Navi H9000
 Mitsubishi HDD Navi H9700
 Pioneer Carrozzeria HDD CyberNavi AVIC-VH009
 Pioneer Carrozzeria HDD CyberNavi AVIC-ZH900MD

Renesas SH-Navi2G (SH7775) — MBX + VGP + FPU + SH-X2(SH-4A)

Samsung S3C2460 — MBX Lite + FPU + ARM926

Samsung S5L8900 — MBX Lite + VGP Lite + FPU (VFP11) + ARM1176
iPhone
iPhone 3G
iPod Touch
iPod Touch 2nd gen
iPod Nano 4th gen
iPod Nano 5th gen

Samsung S5PC510 — MBX Lite + VGP Lite + FPU + A10 + POWER VR 540
MEIZU M9

SiRF SiRFprima — MBX Lite + VGP Lite + MVED1 + FPU + ARM11
 Dmedia G400 WiMAX MID
 CMMB K704
 CMMB T700
 ACCO MID Q7
 ACCO P439
 FineDrive iQ500
 RMVB C7
 Vanhe T700
 WayteQ X610, X620, N800, N810, X810, X820
 YFI 80T-1

Sunplus unidentified — MBX

Texas Instruments OMAP 2420 — MBX + VGP + FPU (VFP11) + ARM1136

 Motorola MOTO Q 9h
 Motorola MOTO Q music 9m
 Motorola MOTO Q PRO
 Motorola MOTORIZR Z8
 Motorola MOTORIZR Z10
 NEC N902i
 NEC N902iS
 NEC N902iX HIGH-SPEED
 Nokia E90 Communicator
 Nokia N82
 Nokia N93
 Nokia N93i
Nokia N95 (Classic, US, SoftBank X02NK Japanese, and 8 GB versions) ( N95 RM-159 / 245 = TI OMAP DM290Z WV  C-68A0KYW  EI )
 Nokia N800
 Nokia N810
 Nokia N810 Wimax edition
 Panasonic P702iD
 Panasonic P702iS
 Panasonic P902i
 Panasonic P902iS
 Sharp SH702iD
 Sharp SH702iS
 Sharp SH902i
 Sharp SH902iS
 Sharp DOLCE SL (SH902iSL)
 Sony Ericsson SO902i
 Sony Ericsson SO902iWP+

Texas Instruments OMAP2430 — MBX Lite + VGP Lite + FPU + ARM1136

 ASUS M536
 Fujitsu F1100
 NEC N903i
 NEC N904i
 NEC N905i
 NEC N905iμ
 Palm Treo 800w
 Panasonic P903i
 Panasonic P903iTV
 Panasonic P903iX HIGH-SPEED
 Samsung SGH-G810
 Samsung SGH-i550
 Samsung SGH-i560
 Samsung innov8 (SGH-i8510)
 Samsung GT-i7110
 Sharp SH704i
 Sharp SH903i
 Sharp SH904i
 Sony Ericsson SO704i
 Sony Ericsson SO903i

Texas Instruments OMAP2530 — MBX Lite + VGP Lite + FPU + ARM1176
 Thinkware iNAVI K2
 Digital Cube iStation T5
 APSI LM480

PowerVR Video Cores (MVED/VXD)

Apple A4 — VXD375
Apple iPad
Apple iPhone 4
Apple iPod Touch 4th Gen
Apple TV Second Generation

Apple A5
Apple iPad 2
Apple iPad Mini
Apple iPhone 4S
Apple iPod Touch 5th Gen

Apple A5X
Apple iPad 3

Apple A6
Apple iPhone 5
Apple iPhone 5C

Apple A6X
Apple iPad 4

Marvell PXA310/312 — MVED

 Airis T483 / T482L
 Blackberry Bold 9700
 Geeks'Phone ONE
 General Mobile DSTL1
 Gigabyte GSmart MS808
 HP iPaq 11x/21x
 HKC Prado
 HKC Mopad 8/E
 HKC G920, G908
 i-MATE 810F (Hummer)
 Motorola FR68 and FR6000
 NIM1000
 NDrive S400
 Pharos 565
 Qigi AK007C, i6-Goal, i6-Win, i6C, U8/U8P
 RoverPC Pro G7, X7, evo V7
 Samsung i780, i900 Omnia, i907 Epix, i908 Omnia, i910 Omnia, SCH-M490 T*OMNIA, SCH-M495 T*OMNIA
 Samsung SPH-M4800 Ultra Messaging II
 SoftBank 930SC Omnia
 WayteQ X520, X-Phone

Samsung S5PC100 — VXD370
Apple iPhone 3GS
Apple iPod Touch 3rd Gen

Samsung Hummingbird S5PC110/SP5C111/S5PV210 — VXD370
PanDigital SuperNova 8" tablet
Samsung Galaxy S series (excluding i9003 and i9001)
Samsung Droid Charge
Samsung Exhibit 4G
Samsung Galaxy Tab P1000 and all variants(excluding Galaxy Tab WiFi P1010)
Samsung Galaxy S WiFi series
Samsung Nexus S series
T-Mobile Sidekick 4G

Samsung Exynos 5410
Samsung Galaxy S4 (GT-I9500)
Meizu MX3(M353)

SI Electronics unidentified — VXD380

Texas Instruments OMAP4430
Amazon Kindle Fire
Google Glass
LG Optimus 3D
LG Optimus L9
LG Prada 3.0
Motorola Atrix 2
Motorola Droid RAZR
Motorola Droid RAZR MAXX
Samsung Galaxy S II (GT-I9100G)
Samsung Galaxy Tab 2 7.0

Texas Instruments OMAP4460
Amazon Kindle Fire HD
Google Nexus Q
Huawei Ascend D1
Samsung Galaxy Nexus

PowerVR Video/Display Cores(PDP)
NEC EMMA 3TL — PDP
 Sony Bravia TV's

Series5XT (SGX)
 PowerVR SGXMP variants available as single and multi-core IP 543XT, 544XT, and 554XT series
 Performance scales 95% linearly with number of cores and clock speed
 Available in single to 16 core variants
 SGX543
(single core) 35M polygon/s @200 MHz
(two cores) 68M polygon/s @200 MHz
(four cores) 133M polygon/s @200 MHz
(eight cores) 266M polygon/s @200 MHz
(sixteen cores) 532M polygon/s @200 MHz
 Licensees:
 Sony
 Renesas
 Texas Instruments
 Apple
 Intel 
 Samsung
 MStar
 MediaTek
 Allwinner

PlayStation Vita
 SGX543MP4+ (four cores) @200 MHz

Renesas G5/AG5/APE5R
 SGX543MP2 (two cores)

Texas Instruments OMAP5430 & OMAP5432
 SGX544MP2 (two cores) @532 MHz

Apple A5 - SGX543MP2 (two cores) 
 Apple iPad 2 (MP2@250 MHz)
 Apple iPad Mini (MP2@250 MHz)
 Apple iPhone 4S (MP2@200 MHz)
 Apple iPod Touch (5th generation)(MP2@200 MHz)
 Apple TV (3rd generation) (MP2@250 MHz)

Apple A5X - SGX543MP4 (four cores) @250 MHz
 Apple iPad (3rd generation)

Apple A6 - SGX543MP3 (three cores) @325 MHz
 Apple iPhone 5

Apple A6X - SGX554MP4 (four cores) @280 MHz  
 Apple iPad (4th generation)

Allwinner Allwinner A31 - SGX544MP2 (two cores) @355 MHz  
 Iben L1 Gaming Tablet

Allwinner Allwinner A31s - SGX544MP2 (two cores) @355 MHz  
 JXD S7800a

Samsung Exynos 5 Octa - SGX544MP3 (three cores) @533 MHz  
 Samsung Galaxy S4 (GT-I9500)

Series6
 Code name: Rogue
 PowerVR Series6 GPUs can deliver 20x or more of the performance of current generation GPU cores targeting comparable markets. This is enabled by an architecture that is around 5x more efficient than previous generations.
 Supported Graphics API's
 Vulkan, OpenGL ES 3.1, OpenGL ES 2.0, OpenGL 3.x/4.x, OpenCL 1.x and DirectX10 with certain family members extending their capabilities to full WHQL-compliant DirectX11.2 functionality.
 Licensees
 Apple
 Allwinner
 ST-Ericsson (defunct)
 Texas Instruments
 Renesas Electronics
 MediaTek
 HiSilicon
 LG
 Intel

Allwinner UltraOcta A80

Quad-core ARM Cortex-A15 and quad-core ARM Cortex-A7 (ARM big.LITTLE), PowerVR G6230, 4K video encoding and decoding.
 Optimus Board
 PCDuino 8
 Cubieboard 8

ST-Ericsson
 Nova A9600, built in 28 nm, 210 GFLOPs, 350 M polygons/s, fill rates in excess of 13 Gpixels/sec, sampling in 2013 (cancelled).

Apple A7
 iPhone 5s, iPad Air, iPad Mini (2nd generation), iPad Mini (3rd generation) - PowerVR G6430 in a four cluster configuration

Apple A8
 iPhone 6, iPhone 6 Plus - PowerVR Series 6XT GX6450@533 MHz (4 clusters)

Apple A8X
 iPad Air 2 - 2* GX6450@533 MHz (mirrored - 8 clusters)

Actions-Semi ActDuino S900

Quad-core ARM Cortex-A53, PowerVR G6230, 4K video decoding.
 Bubblegum-96

Series6XT 
MediaTek MT8173

Dual-core ARM Cortex-A72 and dual-core ARM Cortex-A53 (ARM big.LITTLE), PowerVR GX6250, 4K H.264/HEVC(10-bit)/VP9 video decoding, WQXGA display support

Renesas R-Car H3

Quad-core ARM Cortex-A57 and quad-core ARM Cortex-A53 (ARM big.LITTLE), ARM Cortex-R7 dual-step, PowerVR GX6650

Series6XE 
Rockchip RK3368

Octa-core ARM Cortex-A53, PowerVR G6110, 4K H.264/H.265 video decoding

References

External links
  Samsung Series5XT license  
  HiSilicon Rogue license  
  MStar Series5XT license
  MediaTek Series5XT license  
  Intel shows Clovertrail performance on a tablet

Technology-related lists